Titus Abimbola Erinle (born 23 June 1927, date of death unknown) is a Nigerian sprinter. He competed in the 100 metres at the 1952 Summer Olympics and the 1956 Summer Olympics. Erinle was eliminated in the heats of the 1954 British Empire and Commonwealth Games 220 yards.

Competition record

References

External links
 

1927 births
Year of death missing
Athletes (track and field) at the 1952 Summer Olympics
Athletes (track and field) at the 1956 Summer Olympics
Nigerian male sprinters
Olympic athletes of Nigeria
Commonwealth Games competitors for Nigeria
Athletes (track and field) at the 1954 British Empire and Commonwealth Games
Place of birth missing
20th-century Nigerian people
21st-century Nigerian people